Zulfiqar Ali (born 1947) was a Kenyan cricketer who played three ODIs for East Africa. In his third match, against England, he took three wickets for 63 runs, the best figures by any East African bowler.

External link
 Cricinfo

1947 births
Living people
East African cricketers
East Africa One Day International cricketers
Cricketers at the 1975 Cricket World Cup
Kenyan cricketers